"Love You Anyway" (Boyzone song)
 "Love You Anyway" (Luke Combs song)